Dhaka-13 is a constituency represented in the Jatiya Sangsad (National Parliament) of Bangladesh since 1996. Current Member of Parliament of this constituency is Alhaz Mohammad Sadek khan of the Awami League.

Boundaries 
The constituency encompasses 28, 29, 30, 31, 32, 33 and 34 of Dhaka North City Corporation.

History 
The constituency was created for the first general elections in 1996.

Members of Parliament

Elections

References

External links
 

Parliamentary constituencies in Bangladesh
Dhaka District